This discography documents albums and singles released by American R&B/disco/pop music singer Gloria Gaynor:

Gaynor has released twenty studio albums, two live albums, ten compilation albums, and 49 singles.

Albums

Studio albums

Live albums
Live! at John J. Burns Town Park (2005, Instant Live)
Ao Vivo: Festival De Verao Salvador (2008, Som Livre)

Compilation albums
The Best of Gloria Gaynor (1977, Polydor)
The Best of Gloria Gaynor (1980, Polydor)
Greatest Hits (1982, Polydor)
Greatest Hits (1988, Polydor)
The Very Best of Gloria Gaynor: I Will Survive (1993, Polydor)
The Collection (1996, Spectrum Music)
The Best of Gloria Gaynor (1997, PolyGram)
I Will Survive: The Anthology (1998, Polydor)
Classic Gloria Gaynor: The Universal Masters Collection (1999, Polydor)
20th Century Masters - The Millennium Collection: The Best of Gloria Gaynor (2000, Polydor)

Singles

Notes

References

Discographies of American artists
Pop music discographies
Rhythm and blues discographies
Disco discographies